Johnny Moke (2 September 1945 – 28 April 2009) was a British shoe designer.

He was born John Joseph Rowley in Walthamstow, east London on 2 September 1945.

Moke had a store at 396 King's Road, Chelsea, London, and his customers included Tom Cruise, Cher, Jools Holland, Paul Weller, Tim Roth, and Gary Oldman.

References

1945 births
2009 deaths
Shoe designers
British fashion designers
King's Road, Chelsea, London